The 2001 season was the Kansas City Chiefs' 32nd in the National Football League (NFL), their 42nd overall and their first under head coach Dick Vermeil. They failed to qualify for the playoffs or to improve upon their 7–9 record from 2000, with a 6–10 record, which netted them a fourth place finish in the AFC West.

Along with new coaches joining the team, new additions appeared on the Chiefs' roster, including running back Priest Holmes and quarterback Trent Green. Coach Dick Vermeil began to install a powerful offense similar to the one he installed in St. Louis to win Super Bowl XXXIV.

Offseason

NFL draft

Undrafted free agents

Personnel

Staff

Roster

Schedule

Preseason

Regular season

Note: Intra-division opponents are in bold text.

* Game originally scheduled for September 16, but was postponed along with all Week 2 games following the September 11 attacks

Game summaries

Week 1: vs. Oakland Raiders

Week 2: vs. New York Giants

Week 3: at Washington Redskins

Week 4: at Denver Broncos

Week 5: vs. Pittsburgh Steelers

Week 6: at Arizona Cardinals

Week 7: vs. Indianapolis Colts

Week 8: at San Diego Chargers

Week 9: at New York Jets

Week 11: vs. Seattle Seahawks

Week 12: vs. Philadelphia Eagles

Week 13: at Oakland Raiders

Week 14: vs. Denver Broncos

Week 15: vs. San Diego Chargers

Week 16: at Jacksonville Jaguars

Week 17: at Seattle Seahawks

Standings

References

Kansas City Chiefs
Kansas City Chiefs seasons
Kansas